The Momin, sometimes referred to as Momna, Mumna or Momina, are a Muslim community found in the state of Gujarat in India.

History and origin
Momin (Muman) is a major caste of Gujarat Muslims. All of the Momnas or Momans (from ) were originally followers of the Satpanthi Ismaili tradition of the fifteenth-century Ismaili Shi‘i dignitary Imam al-Din, or Imamshah. However, during the reign of the Mughal Emperor Aurengzeb, the Ismaili Momnas were heavily persecuted and were forced to practice pious circumspection (taqiyyah), outwardly adhering to other traditions within Islam. Over time, many Momnas lost contact with their original faith. Presently, the Momnas who adhere to Ismailism are known as “the Momnas of the old faith” (junā dharma nā moman), while those who were converted to Sunni Islam are known as “the Momnas of the new faith” (navā dharma nā moman).

Present circumstances

The Momna are now divided into three endogamous groups, the Shia Momna found in Mehsana District, Ahmedabad city, and the talukas of Dholka and Dhandhuka of Ahmadabad District, the Sunni Momna who re-concentrated in fifty four villages of Wankaner and Morbi talukas of Morbi District, also nine villages (Momin Navgam Sunni Jamat) of Sanand Taluka of Ahmedabad district and the Wahabi Momna of Mehsana and Banaskantha Districts. One of their Village name is   Sedrana which is in patan taluka Their mother tongue is Gujarati. In addition to the three divisions, the Momna community are also divided into a number of clans, the main ones being the Peer Mohammad Karadia, Kadivar, Bhoraniya, Aghariya, Aathiya, Shersia, Khorzia, Wankaneri, Paradha, Badi, Serasia, Vakalya, Dholkhawalia, Godhrawalia, Kapadia, Charoliya, Dekavadia, Vadaviya, Bavara, Mathakiya and Chaudhary, all of equal status. Their main occupation is farming, while many urban Momna are involved with weaving. Like other Gujarati Muslims, the Momna have a caste association, the Momin Jamat. After 1950 they migrated from gujrat to Mumbai. In Mumbai they first located in murga giran and then murga giran to Momin Nagar which is in Jogeshwari West. there first occupation was Hotel line and Taxi driving. Now the spreads in whole Maharashtra.

References

Muslim communities of Gujarat
Sindhi tribes